Jane Alexander (née Quigley; born October 28, 1939) is an American actress and author. She is the recipient of two Primetime Emmy Awards, a Tony Award, and nominations for four Academy Awards, and three Golden Globe Awards. From 1993 to 1997, Alexander served as the chairwoman of the National Endowment for the Arts.

Alexander won the 1969 Tony Award for Best Featured Actress in a Play for her performance in the Broadway production of The Great White Hope. Other Broadway credits include 6 Rms Riv Vu (1972), The Night of the Iguana (1988), The Sisters Rosensweig (1993) and Honour (1998). She has received a total of eight Tony Award nominations and was inducted into the American Theater Hall of Fame in 1994.

Her film breakthrough came with the romantic drama The Great White Hope (1970), which earned her a nomination for the Academy Award for Best Actress. Her subsequent Oscar nominations were for her roles in All the President's Men (1976), Kramer vs. Kramer (1979), and Testament (1983). An eight-time Emmy nominee, she received her first nomination for playing Eleanor Roosevelt in Eleanor and Franklin (1976), a role that required her to age from 18 to 60. She has won two Emmys for Outstanding Supporting Actress in a Miniseries or Movie for Playing for Time (1980) and Warm Springs (2005).

Early life
Alexander was born Jane Quigley in Boston, Massachusetts, daughter of Ruth Elizabeth (née Pearson), a nurse, and Thomas B. Quigley, an orthopedic surgeon. She graduated from Beaver Country Day School, an all-girls school in Chestnut Hill outside of Boston, where she discovered her love of acting.

Encouraged by her father to go to college before embarking on an acting career, Alexander attended Sarah Lawrence College in Yonkers, New York, where she concentrated on theater, but also studied mathematics with an eye toward computer programming, in the event that she failed as an actress. Also while at Sarah Lawrence, she shared an apartment with Hope Cooke, who would become Queen Consort of the last king of Sikkim. Alexander spent her junior year studying at the University of Edinburgh in Scotland, where she participated in the Edinburgh University Dramatic Society. The experience solidified her determination to continue acting.

Career
Alexander made her Broadway debut in 1963, replacing Phyllis Wynn as Sandy Dennis' standby in A Thousand Clowns. She reportedly performed the role a handful of times. Alexander's major break in acting came in 1967 when she played Eleanor Backman in the original production of Howard Sackler's The Great White Hope at Arena Stage in Washington, DC. Like her co-star, James Earl Jones, she went on to play the part both on Broadway (1968), winning a Tony Award for her performance, and in the film version (1970), which earned her an Oscar nomination. Alexander's additional screen credits include All the President's Men (1976), Kramer vs. Kramer (1979), and Testament (1983), all of which earned her Oscar nods, Brubaker (1980), The Cider House Rules (1999), and Fur (2006), in which she played Gertrude Nemerov, mother of Diane Arbus, played in the film by Nicole Kidman.

The play The Time of Your Life was revived on March 17, 1972, at the Huntington Hartford Theater in Los Angeles with Alexander, Henry Fonda, Gloria Grahame, Lewis J. Stadlen, Richard Dreyfuss, Ron Thompson, Strother Martin, Richard X. Slattery, and Pepper Martin among the cast with Edwin Sherin directing.

Alexander portrayed Eleanor Roosevelt in two television productions, Eleanor and Franklin (1976) and Eleanor and Franklin: The White House Years (1977);  she also played FDR's mother, Sara Delano Roosevelt, in HBO's Warm Springs (2005) with Kenneth Branagh and Cynthia Nixon, a role which garnered her an Emmy Award for Best Supporting Actress.

Alexander co-starred with Rachel Roberts in Steven Gether's teleplay and production of A Circle of Children (1977), based on Mary MacCracken's autobiographical book about emotionally disturbed children (with an emphasis on autism), which won Gether an Emmy. Alexander also starred in its sequel, Lovey: A Circle of Children, Part II (1978).

In 1979, the Supersisters trading card set was produced and distributed; one of the cards featured Alexander's name and picture.

Alexander's other television films include Arthur Miller's Playing for Time, co-starring Vanessa Redgrave, for which Alexander won another Emmy Award; Malice in Wonderland (as famed gossip-monger Hedda Hopper); Blood & Orchids; and In Love and War (1987) co-starring James Woods, which tells the story of James and Sybil Stockdale during Stockdale's eight years as a US prisoner of war in Vietnam. Alexander also played the protagonist, Dr. May Foster, in the HBO drama series Tell Me You Love Me. Her character, a psychotherapist, serves as the connecting link between three couples coping with relational and sexual difficulties. The show's frank portrayal of "senior" sexuality and explicit sex scenes generated controversy, although it won a rare endorsement by the AARP. She also had a minor role as Dr. Graznik in The Ring.
 
In 1993, President Bill Clinton appointed Alexander chairperson of the National Endowment for the Arts, the organization that had provided partial funding for The Great White Hope at Arena Stage. Alexander moved to Washington, DC, and served as chair of the NEA until 1997. Her book, Command Performance: an Actress in the Theater of Politics (2000), describes the challenges she faced heading the NEA at a time when the 104th U.S. Congress, headed by Newt Gingrich, unsuccessfully strove to shut it down. She was elected a fellow of the American Academy of Arts and Sciences in 1999.

In 2004, Alexander, together with her husband, Edwin Sherin, joined the theater faculty at Florida State University. She serves on various boards, including the Wildlife Conservation Society, the National Audubon Society, Project Greenhope, the National Stroke Association, and Women's Action for Nuclear Disarmament, and she has received the Israel Cultural Award and the Helen Caldicott Leadership Award. Alexander is also a fellow of the International Leadership Forum. In 2009 Alexander starred in Thom Thomas's play A Moon to Dance By at the Pittsburgh Playhouse and at the George Street Playhouse in New Brunswick, New Jersey. It was directed by her husband, Edwin Sherin.

Personal life
Alexander met her first husband, Robert Alexander, in the early 1960s in New York City, where both were pursuing acting careers. They had one son, Jace Alexander, in 1964, and the couple divorced a decade later. Alexander had been acting regularly in various regional theaters when she met producer/director Edwin Sherin in Washington, DC, where he was artistic director at Arena Stage. Alexander starred in the original theatrical production of The Great White Hope under Sherin's direction at Arena Stage prior to the play's Broadway debut. The two became good friends and, once divorced from their respective spouses, became romantically involved, marrying in 1975. Between the two, they have four children, Alexander's son Jace and Sherin's three sons, Tony, Geoffrey, and Jon. Edwin Sherin died at the age of 87, on May 4, 2017.

Filmography

Film

Television

Stage

References

Further reading
 Alexander, Jane (2000). Command Performance: An Actress in the Theater of Politics. New York: PublicAffairs. .
 International Leadership Forum biography
 Lawson, Carol. "Howard Sackler, 52, Playwright Who Won Pulitzer Prize, Dead;" NYT (The New York Times). October 15, 1982. accessed September 8, 2006. (NOTE: payment required for full article, if retrieved online)

External links

 
 
 
 
 
 
 Downstage Center at the American Theatre Wing interview
 Jane Alexander in the International Leadership Forum

20th-century American actresses
21st-century American actresses
Actresses from Boston
American film actresses
American stage actresses
American television actresses
Fellows of the American Academy of Arts and Sciences
Drama Desk Award winners
Living people
National Endowment for the Arts
Outstanding Performance by a Supporting Actress in a Miniseries or Movie Primetime Emmy Award winners
Sarah Lawrence College alumni
Tony Award winners
Beaver Country Day School alumni
1939 births